Cyclostrema exiguum is a species of sea snail, a marine gastropod mollusk in the family Liotiidae.

Description
The diameter of the shell is 2.3 mm. The shell is rather widely umbilicated. It has a subdiscoidal shape with radiating riblets fimbriating four spiral cariniae.

Distribution
This species occurs in the Indian Ocean off Madagascar, Réunion and in the Gulf of Aden.

References

 Dautzenberg, Ph. (1929). Contribution à l'étude de la faune de Madagascar: Mollusca marina testacea. Faune des colonies françaises, III (fasc. 4). Société d'Editions géographiques, maritimes et coloniales: Paris. 321–636, plates IV-VII pp.

External links
 

exiguum
Gastropods described in 1849